Lars Klingbeil (born 23 February 1978) is a German politician of the Social Democratic Party who has been serving as the party's Co-Leader since 2021, together with Saskia Esken. 

Klingbeil previously was the General Secretary of the Social Democratic Party from December 2017 to December 2021. Since 2001 he has been a member of the City Council of Munster and a member of the District Council of Heide. He was a Member of the Bundestag for about 9 months in 2005 and has been a member again since the 2009 Federal Election. From 2003 till 2007, Klingbeil was the Deputy Leader of the Jusos, the SPD youth wing. Klingbeil is a member of the Seeheim Circle, the right wing of the SPD, which shares many similarities with Tony Blair's New Labour.

Early life and education 
After doing his Abitur in Munster and completing his alternative civilian service, in 1999 Klingbeil began studying political science at Leibniz University Hannover, he graduated in 2004 with a master's degree. From 2001 to 2004 he received a scholarship from the Friedrich Ebert Foundation (FES).

Political career 
After finished his studies he worked as youth education advisor for the Social Democratic Party in North Rhine-Westphalia.

Member of Parliament 
From the 24 January 2005 until 18 October 2005 Klingbeil was a Member of the Bundestag after the resignation of Jann-Peter Janssen. During these 9 months Klingbeil was a member of the Committee on European Affairs, the Health Committee and a deputy member of the Defence Committee of the Bundestag.

Leaving office after the 2005 national elections, Klingbeil worked as chief of staff to the chairman of the Social Democratic Party in Lower Saxony Garrelt Duin. Furthermore, Klingbeil was a member of the SPD leadership's International Commission from 2004 until 2007, and since 2006 he has been the deputy leader of the SPD in the Soltau-Falingbostel regional council.

Klingbeil stood in the 2009 federal elections in the constituency Rotenburg I - Soltau Fallingbostel, however, he lost with 35.2% of the vote against the CDU's candidate Reinhard Grindel who had won 40.2% of the vote. He did manage to enter the Bundestag as a List MP for Lower Saxony.

Klingbeil has been a member of the Defence Committee since 2009 as well as being a deputy member of the Committee on Cultural Affairs and Media. Since 2013, he has also been leading the Bundestag group of SPD parliamentarians from Lower Saxony, the second largest delegations within the SPD parliamentary group. In addition to his committee assignments, he served as deputy chairman of the German-Russian Parliamentary Friendship Group from 2010 until 2013.

Klingbeil managed to win the constituency of Rotenburg I – Heidekreis in the 2017 elections, winning with 41.2% of vote. He contested the same constituency at the 2021 German federal election.

Secretary General of the SPD 
On 19 October 2017, Social Democratic Party chairman Martin Schulz nominated Klingbeil as secretary general. He was confirmed on 8 December 2017 with 70.62% of the vote at the SPD Party Conference in Berlin, succeeding Hubertus Heil who had announced his resignation after the SPD disastrous loss in the 2017 election. In the negotiations to form a fourth cabinet under Chancellor Angela Merkel following the elections, he was part of the leadership team of his party's delegation. He also led the working group on digital policy, alongside Helge Braun and Dorothee Bär.

Other activities

Corporate boards
 FC Bayern, Member of the Advisory Board (since 2022) 
 Deutsche Druck- und Verlagsgesellschaft (DDVG), Ex-Officio Member of the supervisory board (since 2017)
 Stadtwerke Munster-Bispingen, Member of the supervisory board (2009–2017)

Regulatory bodies
 Federal Network Agency for Electricity, Gas, Telecommunications, Post and Railway (BNetzA), Alternate Member of the advisory board (2013–2018)

Non-profit organizations
 Business Forum of the Social Democratic Party of Germany, Member of the Political Advisory Board (since 2018)
 St Barbara Foundation, Member of the Board of Trustees 
 Liquid Democracy, Member of the Board of Trustees
 2017 German Computer Games Award, Member of the Jury
  German Association for Defence Technology (DWT), Member of the Presidium (2013–2017)
 Soldiers and Veterans Foundation (SVS), Member of the Board of Trustees (2009–2017)
 German Welfare Society (SoVD), Member
 IG Bergbau, Chemie, Energie (IG BCE), Member
 Lions Club, Member

Personal life 
Klingbeil has been married to Lena-Sophie Müller since 2019.

References 

|-

1978 births
Living people
Members of the Bundestag for Lower Saxony
People from Heidekreis
University of Hanover alumni
Members of the Bundestag 2021–2025
Members of the Bundestag 2017–2021
Members of the Bundestag 2013–2017
Members of the Bundestag 2009–2013
Members of the Bundestag 2002–2005
Members of the Bundestag for the Social Democratic Party of Germany